2 Bit Pie are an English electronic music group formed in 2005 as a collaboration between Fluke and many other musicians, some of whom had previously worked with Fluke, and others who already had significant experience within the music industry, such as Andy Gray.

The band's debut album titled 2Pie Island was released digitally on December 31, 2004. Later released physically on September 4, 2006. This was followed by a period of inactivity from the band's label, One Little Indian, before the singles "Nobody Never" and "Here I Come" were released in 2005.

History and line-up
2 Bit Pie is the direct descendant of Fluke, the group including both of the current Fluke members, Mike Bryant and Jon Fugler. Both Bryant and Fugler have a writing credit each for every song on 2Pie Island with Andy Gray listed as an additional credit on "Fly" and "Nobody Never". Gray had previously worked with Korn and Paul Oakenfold and is a firmly established figure in the music production industry. The group's vocals are provided by Jon Fugler, who was also the vocalist for Fluke, with additional vocals provided by Yukiko Ishii, formerly of Tokyo-based trip hop band She Shell, Dilshani Weerasinghe, of the Royal Opera, Louise Marshall, Margo Buchannon and Marli Buck.

Discography

Albums
2Pie Island (2006)

Singles
"Nobody Never" (2005)
"Here I Come" (2006)

References

External links
 2 Bit Pie fan site

British techno music groups
Intelligent dance musicians
British industrial music groups
One Little Independent Records artists
English house music groups
English electronic music groups